Queen Elizabeth Oval is a sports stadium located in Bendigo, Australia primarily used for Australian rules football and cricket.

History

Cricket
The Oval, originally known as Upper Reserve, hosted touring cricket teams as early as 1897.

The ground hosted two World Series Cricket exhibition matches in 1977 and 1979.

During the 1990s one List A and two first-class matches were held at the ground.

It also hosted one Women's Test cricket in 1985 between Australia and England.

Australian rules football
Bendigo Football League (BFL) teams Sandhurst and South Bendigo play home games at the stadium. The ground is also used for BFL finals series.

The oval hosted the Bendigo Football Club throughout its time in the Victorian Football League (VFL), from 1998 until 2014.

Other uses
In 1988 the oval hosted an international soccer match between Australia and New Zealand.

The venue also played host to the Rugby sevens competition at the 2004 Commonwealth Youth Games.

Facilities
On 29 February 2008, at an NAB Challenge Cup game under lights, there was a blackout in the final quarter.

In 2011 the ground was redeveloped at a cost of 2.2m. The upgrade included a new terraced seating section, capable of holding 900 people, the installation of all-weather grass, lighting being upgraded to Australian Football League (AFL) standard, and a new electronic scoreboard and big screen being installed. Asbestos in the grandstand was also removed.

See also

List of sports venues named after individuals

References

External links

 

Australian rules football grounds
World Series Cricket venues
Cricket grounds in Australia
Buildings and structures in Bendigo
Bendigo